Wavellite is an aluminium basic phosphate mineral with formula Al3(PO4)2(OH, F)3·5H2O. Distinct crystals are rare, and it normally occurs as translucent green radial or spherical clusters.

Discovery and occurrence 

Wavellite was first described in 1805 for an occurrence at High Down, Filleigh, Devon, England and named by William Babington in 1805 in honor of Dr. William Wavell (1750–1829), a Devon-based physician, botanist, historian, and naturalist, who brought the mineral to the attention of fellow mineralogists.

It occurs in association with crandallite and variscite in fractures in aluminous metamorphic rock, in hydrothermal regions and in phosphate rock deposits. It is found in a wide variety of locations notably in the Mount Ida, Arkansas area in the Ouachita Mountains.

It is sometimes used as a gemstone.

See also 
 List of minerals
 Apatite, fluoro-phosphate of calcium
 Pyromorphite, chloro-phosphate of lead
 Turquoise, a hydrated phosphate of copper and aluminium

References

External links 
 

Aluminium minerals
Phosphate minerals
Halide minerals
Orthorhombic minerals
Minerals in space group 62
Luminescent minerals
Gemstones